Aikya Kerala Congress was an alliance consisting of four political parties in Kerala, India;  Kerala Congress (Mani), Kerala Congress (Balakrishna Pillai), Kerala Congress (Jacob) and Kerala Congress (Secular). The alliance was formed in November 2008. K.M. Mani was the chairman of AKC, whilst R. Balakrishna Pillai was the convenor of the alliance.

The alliance was unsuccessful and disbanded.

References

2008 establishments in Kerala
Defunct political party alliances in India
Political parties established in 2008
Political parties with year of disestablishment missing